Charles Ballard was an association football player who represented New Zealand, playing in New Zealand's first ever official international.

Ballard made his full All Whites debut in New Zealand's inaugural A-international fixture, beating Australia 3–1 on 17 June 1922 and ended his international playing career with eight A-international caps and one goal to his credit, his final cap an appearance in a 4–1 loss to Canada on 23 July 1927.

Ballard appeared in two Chatham Cup finals, in 1923 and 1925.

References

External links
 

Year of birth missing
Year of death missing
New Zealand association footballers
New Zealand international footballers
Association football forwards